Kyle Verreynne (born 12 May 1997) is a South African cricketer who plays for Western Province. He made his international debut for the South Africa cricket team in February 2020.

Domestic career
He made his Twenty20 cricket debut for Western Province against Namibia on 2 September 2016 in the 2016 Africa T20 Cup.

In June 2018, he was named in the squad for the Cape Cobras team for the 2018–19 season. In October 2018, he was named in Cape Town Blitz's squad for the first edition of the Mzansi Super League T20 tournament. In September 2019, he was named in Western Province's squad for the 2019–20 CSA Provincial T20 Cup. In April 2021, he was named in Western Province's squad, ahead of the 2021–22 cricket season in South Africa.

For the upcoming SA20 competition to be played in 2023, Verreynne will play for Joburg Super Kings.

International career
In December 2015, he was named in South Africa's squad for the 2016 Under-19 Cricket World Cup.

In January 2020, he was named in South Africa's One Day International (ODI) squad for their series against England. The following month, he was also named in South Africa's ODI squad for their series against Australia. He made his ODI debut for South Africa, against Australia, on 29 February 2020.

In November 2020, Verreynne was named in South Africa's squad for their limited overs series against England. In December 2020, Verreynne was named in South Africa's Test squad for their series against Sri Lanka.

In March 2021, Verreynne was named in South Africa's Twenty20 International (T20I) squad for their series against Pakistan. In May 2021, Verreynne was named in South Africa's Test squad for their series against the West Indies. Verreynne made his Test debut on 10 June 2021, for South Africa against the West Indies, scoring 6 runs, at Gros Islet, St Lucia. In February 2022, in the second match against New Zealand, Verreynne scored his first century in Test cricket, with an unbeaten 136 runs.

References

External links
 

1997 births
Living people
Cricketers from Pretoria
South African cricketers
South Africa Test cricketers
South Africa One Day International cricketers
Cape Cobras cricketers
Cape Town Blitz cricketers
Paarl Rocks cricketers
Western Province cricketers
Wicket-keepers